Vern-d'Anjou (literally Vern of Anjou) is a former commune in the Maine-et-Loire department in western France. On 28 December 2015, it was merged into the new commune Erdre-en-Anjou.

See also
Communes of the Maine-et-Loire department

References

Verndanjou